Holy Cross College is a Roman Catholic school in Kalutara, Sri Lanka.

History 

According to the historical annals, during the latter half of the 19th century a Burgher national named Brohier had taken the initiative to start a private School in rented bungalow located in close proximity to Holy Cross Church.

In the year 1890, the parish priest of Kalamulla, Kalutara, Rev. Father Wilkinson, who was the first rector baptized this private Institution of Education as Holy Cross English School. Later it was registered as Holy Cross Upper English School by Rev. Father Leo Fernando the founder principal of the present Holy Cross College, who succeeded Rev. Fr. Wilkinson.

Father Leo Fernando, through great effort obtained the assistance of the government for Holy Cross College to function as a semi government school.

Rev. Fr. M. Herel who hailed from Nancy, France became the rector of Holy Cross College for a period of 7 years since 1905. He was succeeded by Rev. Fr. Robert Fernando who was responsible for introducing numerous innovative features to Holy Cross College.

One of the striking achievements during his period was that a pupil of the college emerged as the First on obtaining the best results out of all the entire Common Wealth Countries, in the Cambridge Examination.
Rev. Fr. F.L.Breton assumed duties as the Principal for a period of 3 years from 1918–1921 during his tenure of office it was Rev. Father Briton who introduced the Cadet Platoon to Holy Cross College.

Rev. Father Breton was succeeded by Rev. Fr. C.V. Croos who served Holy Cross College for 9 years since 1921. During this period he was successful in expanding the buildings by adding a Science Laboratory and another building to the college. In addition, Holy Cross College was upgraded as a Secondary School during the period.

Rev. Fr. Gaston Chaulieu a French national happened to be the only Principal of Holy Cross College to serve an unbroken period of 16 years from 1930 to 1946.
This era was considered by many as the Golden Era of the Holy Cross College which could be proud of its unique achievements.
Construction of new buildings, conducting Inter House Athletic Events and dividing the college into a Girls’ School and a Boys' School were some of the highlights of this era. Students offered both London Matriculation and Chamber of Commerce Examinations.

British Governor Sir Edward Stubbs graced the Annual Prize Giving Celebrations of Holy Cross College (1935–36) as the Chief Guest was one of the striking events of this period.

Rev.Fr.Arthur M. Fernando became the first Director of Holy Cross College (1945–1948). During this period, the number of student population was on the increase over 1000 and for the first time students offered University Entrance Examination. Within his administration, in 1947 the college was promoted to one of the First Grade Schools of the Island.

Rev.Fr.Benedict J.C. Pinto (1948–1954): Holding of the National Independence Day Celebrations of Kalutara District Schools on the Grounds of Holy Cross College could be cited as an important and colourful event participated by an unprecedented gathering of distinguished visitors.

The First Prime Minister of Independent Sri Lanka, Right Honourable D.S. Senanayake was present to grace the occasion as the Chief Guest.

First Governor General of Independent Sri Lanka, Lord Soulbury was the Chief Guest on Golden Jubilee Prize Giving Day Celebrations held in Holy Cross College.

In addition Cadet Troop of the college could win the coveted Herman Loos Trophy meant for the Island's Best School Cadet Troop. In 1948 College Drama Troupe won the Shakespeare Trophy in the Inter School Shakespeare English Drama Competition organized by Ceylon Thespians.

Radio Ceylon (as SLBC was known then) organized All Island Inter School English Speech Contest and the participant pupils of Holy Cross College, won the First Place in both Junior and Senior contests.

Rev. Fr. Theodor E. Pieris (1954–1970) During this period the government was engaged in taking over of Schools; Holy Cross College was allowed to function as a non-fee levying Private School. Banning of Cadet Platoon and the termination of State grants were some of the crises encountered by the college during this period.

Rev. Fr. Themothy Pieris (1970–1973) During this period, Holy Cross College won the Gold Medals as the winners in both Senior and Junior Contests in the All Island English Speech Contests organized by the Department of Education.

Mr. M.J. Anthony Cooray (1973–1978): For the first time in the history of Holy Cross College, Mr. Anthony Cooray happened to be its first lay Principal. During his period the Old Boy's Association Holy Cross College could be reorganized.

Every Institution has to encounter both vibrant and dormant periods on its forward march and Holy Cross College was not an exception. Due to unavoidable circumstances Holy Cross College had to maintain a low profile for a brief period until the arrival of the Congregation of Marist Brothers for its rescue. 
On the invitation of Archbishop of Colombo, since 1978 Marist Brothers took over the administration of Holy Cross College. Speedy resurgence of every facet of Holy Cross College could be witnessed under the dedicated Marist Brothers.

In order to cater to the growing demand of the parents for admissions, the Marist Brothers had to face the onerous task of providing more and more buildings and the development of infrastructure of the college.

Rev. Brother. E. Francis Silva: (1978–1987) During the vicissitude experienced by the Holy Cross College in its dark era, a great endeavour was made by Rev. Brother Francis Silva to revive the activities of the Holy Cross College.

Sports Section of the college was revitalized. In 1980 the teachers’ salaries were paid by the government. As a direct result of the maintenance of good public relations, Rev. Brother Francis Silva could obtain the cooperation of the Old Boys’ Association on the forward march of Holy Cross College. An annual friendly cricket encounter named "Battle of the Lagoons" was started in 1979 against Maris Stella College, Negombo. This brought unity among the students in an unprecedented scale. Inaugural match was held in Kalutara.  Jagath Santha Fernando led HCC team at the inaugural match, which ended up in a draw.  Holy Cross won the second encounter, which was held in Negombo and the victorious team was led by Darmapriya Vidanapathirana (team members: Lasantha Mudalige, Janaka Gunawardena, Jagath Santha Fernando, Lasantha Gomez, Shiromal Fernando, Thilak Sudaksheen, Joseph Guneratne, Lalith Samarasinghe, Sisira Ratnayake, Richard Wijesekara).

Rev. Brother Clinton Perera: (1988–2000) Expansion of the college play ground, and the construction of four storied building and foundation laying for a five storied building took place during his tenure of office. In addition, the expansion of Laboratory and Library facilities also took place.

Rev. Brother Lal Fonseka: (2000–2004) during his period, the infrastructure development activities launched by Rev. Brother Clinton Perera was continued. He was well focused in improving academic standards of the college and he achieved his goal by having 80% pass rate in GCE A/L examination. Not only pass rate but also university admission rate among the college graduates was around 30%-40% during his time period.

Rev. Brother Ranjith Perera: (2004–2009) amidst numerous financial constraints faced by the college Principal and Director of Holy Cross College Rev. Brother. Ranjith Perera has been successful in completing this high profiled auditorium facility of the college.

Very.Rev.Fr Emmanuel Fernando: was the Rector for an interim period of four months which after college was taken from Marist Brothers.

Rev.Dr. Camillus Fernando: (2010–2015) Since his installation as the rector of the college he has been instrumental in developing English as the medium of college activities, which was initiated by Rev. Brother Lal Fonseka and Rev. Brother Ranjith Perera.

Rev.Fr. Carlton De Silva: (2015-2019)

Rev.Fr. Jayashantha Sovis:  (2019-2022 August)

Rev.Fr. Prasad Niranjan Fernando:  (2022 October-present)

See also
:Category:Alumni of Holy Cross College, Kalutara

References

Boys' schools in Sri Lanka
Catholic schools in Sri Lanka
Schools in Kalutara